Francis Rory Peregrine "Perry" Anderson (born 11 September 1938) is a British intellectual, historian and essayist. His work ranges across historical sociology, intellectual history, and cultural analysis. What unites Anderson's work is a preoccupation with Western Marxism.

Anderson is perhaps best known as the moving force behind the New Left Review. He is Professor of History and Sociology at the University of California, Los Angeles (UCLA). Anderson has written many books, most recently Brazil Apart: 1964-2019 and The H-Word: The Peripeteia of Hegemony. He is the brother of political scientist Benedict Anderson (1936–2015).

Background and early life 
Anderson was born in 1938 in London. His father, James Carew O'Gorman Anderson (1893–1946), known as Séamas, an official with the Chinese Maritime Customs, was born into an Anglo-Irish family, the younger son of Brigadier-General Sir Francis Anderson, of Ballydavid, County Waterford. He was descended from the Anderson family of Ardbrake, Bothriphnie, Scotland, who had settled in Ireland in the early 18th century.

Anderson's mother, Veronica Beatrice Mary Bigham, was English,<ref>"The Influence of Benedict Anderson".</</ref> the daughter of Trevor Bigham, who was the Deputy Commissioner of the London Metropolitan Police, 1914–1931. Anderson's grandmother, Frances, Lady Anderson, belonged to the Gaelic Gorman clan of County Clare and was the daughter of the Irish Home Rule Member of Parliament Major Purcell O'Gorman, himself the son of Nicholas Purcell O'Gorman who had been involved with the Republican Society of United Irishmen during the 1798 Rebellion, later becoming Secretary of the Catholic Association in the 1820s. Anderson's father had previously been married to the novelist Stella Benson, and it was after her death in 1933 that he married again.

Anderson was educated at Eton and Worcester College, Oxford, where he took his first degree.

Early in his life, Anderson made a brief foray into rock criticism, writing under the pseudonym Richard Merton.

Career 
In 1962 Anderson became editor of the New Left Review, a position he held for twenty years. As scholars of the New Left began to reassess their canon in the mid-1970s, Anderson provided an influential perspective. He published two major volumes of analytical history in 1974: Passages from Antiquity to Feudalism focuses on the creation and endurance of feudal social formations, while Lineages of the Absolutist State examines monarchical absolutism. Within their respective topics they are each vast in scope, assessing the whole history of Europe from classical times to the nineteenth century. The books achieved an instant prominence for Anderson, whose wide-ranging analysis synthesised elements of history, philosophy, and political theory.

In the 1980s, Anderson took office as a professor at the New School for Social Research in New York. He returned as editor at NLR in 2000 for three more years, and after his retirement continued to serve on the journal's editorial committee. As of 2019, he has continued to make contributions to the London Review of Books, and pursued teaching as a Distinguished Professor of History and Sociology at the University of California, Los Angeles.

Influence and criticism 

Anderson bore the brunt of the disapproval of E. P. Thompson in the latter's The Poverty of Theory, in a controversy during the late 1970s over the structuralist Marxism of Louis Althusser, and the use of history and theory in the politics of the Left. In the mid-1960s, Thompson wrote an essay for the annual Socialist Register that rejected Anderson's view of aristocratic dominance of Britain's historical trajectory, as well as Anderson's seeming preference for continental European theorists over radical British traditions and empiricism. Anderson delivered two responses to Thompson's polemics, first in an essay in New Left Review (January–February 1966) called "Socialism and Pseudo-Empiricism" and then in a more conciliatory yet ambitious overview, Arguments within English Marxism (1980).

While Anderson faced many attacks in his native Britain for favouring continental European philosophers over British thinkers, he did not spare Western European Marxists from criticism; see his Considerations on Western Marxism (1976). Nevertheless, many of his assaults were delivered against postmodernist currents in continental Europe. In his book In the Tracks of Historical Materialism, Anderson depicts Paris as the new capital of intellectual reaction, placing himself at odds with the popular notion of postmodernism as a left-wing heresy.

Works 
 Passages From Antiquity to Feudalism (1974). London: New Left Books. .
 Lineages of the Absolutist State (1974). London: New Left Books. .
 Considerations on Western Marxism (1976). London: Verso. .
 Arguments within English Marxism (1980). London: Verso. .
 In the Tracks of Historical Materialism (1983).  London: Verso. .
 English Questions (1992). London: Verso. .
 A Zone of Engagement (1992). London: Verso. .
 The Origins of Postmodernity (1998). London: Verso. .
 Spectrum: From Right to Left in the World of Ideas (2005). London: Verso. .
 The New Old World (2009). London: Verso. .
 The Indian Ideology (2012). New Delhi: Three Essays Collective. .
 American Foreign Policy and Its Thinkers (2014). London: Verso. .
 The H-Word: The Peripeteia of Hegemony (2017). London: Verso. .
 The Antinomies of Antonio Gramsci (2017). London: Verso. .
 Brazil Apart: 1964-2019 (2019). London: Verso. 
 Ever Closer Union?: Europe in the West (2021). London: Verso. ISBN 9781839764417.
 Different Speeds, Same Furies: Powell, Proust and other Literary Forms (2022). London: Verso. ISBN 9781804290798.

References

Further reading 
 Paul Blackledge, Perry Anderson, Marxism, and the New Left. Merlin Press, 2004. .
 Alex Callinicos, 'Perry Anderson and Western Marxism', International Socialism, 23 (1984). 
 
 Gregory Elliott, Perry Anderson: The Merciless Laboratory of History. University of Minnesota Press, 1998. .
  A commentary on the Rolling Stones, in particular songs from their 1966–67 LPs Aftermath and Between the Buttons.

External links 

 Archive of Perry Anderson's articles for The Nation
 Archive of Perry Anderson's articles for The New Left Review
 The New Statesman Profile – Perry Anderson
 
 "Gandhi Centre Stage" from the London Review of Books, 2012-07-05

1938 births
Living people
Marxist theorists
British Marxist historians
Alumni of Worcester College, Oxford
University of California, Los Angeles faculty
Intellectual historians
British sociologists
British political writers
English essayists
British Marxists
Critics of postmodernism
People educated at Eton College
Writers about globalization
Academic journal editors
British social commentators